The term beautiful mistake may refer to:

 A homewrecker
 The Beautiful Mistake, a post-hardcore band from San Diego, California
The Beautiful Mistake (EP)
 Beautiful Mistake (film), a 2000 film written and directed by Marc Evans
 "Beautiful Mistakes", a 2021 song by Maroon 5 featuring Megan Thee Stallion